Podococcus is a genus of palms found in tropical Africa.  It includes two recognized species:

 Podococcus acaulis Hua - Gabon, Congo-Brazzaville
 Podococcus barteri G. Mann & H. Wendl. - Gabon, Congo-Brazzaville, Nigeria, Cameroon, Equatorial Guinea, Cabinda, Zaire

References

Arecoideae
Arecaceae genera
Flora of West-Central Tropical Africa
Flora of West Tropical Africa
Trees of Africa